St Peter's Church, Gamston is a Grade I listed parish church in the Church of England in Gamston, Bassetlaw.

History

The church dates from the 13th century. It was restored by Sir George Gilbert Scott in 1855.

It is in a joint benefice with 
St. Nicholas' Church, Askham
All Saints' Church, Babworth
St Martin's Church, Bole
Our Lady and St Peter's Church, Bothamsall
St John the Baptist Church, Clarborough
All Saints' Church, Eaton
St Giles' Church, Elkesley
St. Helen's Church, Grove
St Peter's Church, Hayton
St Martin's Church, North Leverton
St Peter and St Paul's Church, North Wheatley
All Hallows' Church, Ordsall
St Martin's Church, Ranby
St Saviour's Church Retford
St Swithun's Church, East Retford
St Michael the Archangel's Church, Retford
All Saints' Church, South Leverton
St Peter and St Paul's Church, Sturton-le-Steeple
St Bartholomew's Church, Sutton-cum-Lound
St Paul's Church, West Drayton

Organ

The church has a two manual pipe organ installed in 1964. A specification of the organ can be found on the National Pipe Organ Register.

References

13th-century church buildings in England
Church of England church buildings in Nottinghamshire
Grade I listed churches in Nottinghamshire